The 1894 Dartmouth football team represented Dartmouth College as a member of the Triangular Football League (TFL) the 1894 college football season. Led by second-year head coach Wallace Moyle, Dartmouth compiled an overall record of 5–4 with a mark of 2–0 in TFL play, winning the league title.

Schedule

References

Dartmouth
Dartmouth Big Green football seasons
Dartmouth football